The 2016–17 season is Dundee United's 108th season, having been founded as Dundee Hibernian in 1909. It marked their first season of play outside the top tier of Scottish football since season 1995–96 and their first season in the Scottish Championship. United also competed in the Challenge Cup, League Cup, Scottish Cup and the Scottish Premiership play-offs.

Summary

Season
United finished third in the Scottish Championship, entering the Scottish Premiership play-offs. They reached the Quarter-final of the League Cup, the fourth round of the Scottish Cup and were crowned champions of the Challenge Cup beating St Mirren in the final.

Management
United were managed by Ray McKinnon, during the 2016–17 season. Following the club's relegation at the end of the previous season manager Mixu Paatelainen departed the club during the close season on 4 May 2016.  On 12 May 2016,  McKinnon was appointed manager on a three-year contract, after compensation was agreed with his previous club Raith Rovers. He had resigned from Raith Rovers on 11 May.

Results and fixtures

Friendlies

Scottish Championship

Premiership play-offs

Scottish League Cup

Group stage

Knockout phase

Scottish Challenge Cup

Scottish Cup

Squad statistics
During the 2016–17 season, United used thirty different players in competitive games. The table below shows the number of appearances and goals scored by each player.

|-
|colspan="12"|Players who left the club during the 2016–17 season
|-

a.  Includes other competitive competitions, including the play-offs and the Challenge Cup.

Team statistics

League table

League Cup tables

Management statistics
Last updated on 28 May 2017

Transfers

Players in

Players out

Loans in

Loans out

See also
List of Dundee United F.C. seasons

Notes

References

Scottish football clubs 2016–17 season
2016-17